Barbarossaplatz is an interchange station and hub on the Cologne Stadtbahn lines 12, 15, 16 and 18 in the Cologne district of Innenstadt. The station is located at Barbarossaplatz, a major junction between the Cologne Ring and Luxemburger Straße. It is one of the few stations in Cologne's city center that has low-floor platforms which only serve high-floor trains.

The station was opened in 1898, and was the terminus of the Vorgebirgsbahn connecting Cologne and Bonn.

With the opening of the Nord-Süd Stadtbahn, line 16 will no longer serve the Cologne Ring, taking the direct route through the new tunnel instead.

Notable places nearby 
 Church of St. Pantaleon
 Rheinische Fachhochschule Köln
 «Kwartier Latäng» student quarter

See also 
 List of Cologne KVB stations

References

External links 
 station info page 
 station layout diagram 

Cologne KVB stations
Innenstadt, Cologne
Railway stations in Germany opened in 1898